Durand Middle/Senior High School is a public school serving grades 6 through 12 in Durand, Pepin County, Wisconsin, United States.

Durand Middle/High School provides Core Academic, Fine Arts and Vocational courses including Advanced Placement courses in Science, Math, Social Science, English and Visual Arts.  We also offer numerous dual-credit courses with CVTC.

Durand Middle/High School also provides a wide variety of extra-curricular activities including Drama, Forensics, Academic Decathlon, and FFA. Athletic programs include Volleyball, Football, Boys/Girls Cross Country, Wrestling, Boys Basketball, Girls Basketball, Golf, Boys/Girls Track, Softball and Baseball.

References

External links
Durand School District
City of Durand

Public high schools in Wisconsin
Public middle schools in Wisconsin
Schools in Pepin County, Wisconsin